Koetschette is a small town in the commune of Rambrouch, in northwestern Luxembourg.  , the town had a population of 118.

Rambrouch
Towns in Luxembourg